Jubin Mitra is an Indian singer, lyricist and music composer.

Career
Mitra started his career with the documentary film Tribute to Akbar Ali Khan where he was a visual artist. In 2009 he joined Mamata Shankar Dance Academy and there he got a chance as a choreographer of a film named Friends. He then released his first song as a music composer with the song Divine Emotion.

Music
 Divine Emotion
 Tum Mile
 Bolo Dugga Maiki
 Meghe Meghe Unplugged
 A Vein of Hope
 Ghum Aschena
 Tor Chokhe
 O Re Manush Re
 Ebar Tor Mora Gange
 Fule Fule Dhole Dhole
 Do Boondh

References

Living people
Bengali singers
21st-century Indian male singers
21st-century Indian singers
Singers from Kolkata
Year of birth missing (living people)